Hermann Lemp (20 July 1914 – 9 November 1943) was a German modern pentathlete. He competed at the 1936 Summer Olympics. He was killed in action during World War II.

References

External links
 

1914 births
1943 deaths
German male modern pentathletes
Olympic modern pentathletes of Germany
Modern pentathletes at the 1936 Summer Olympics
People from Rosenheim
Sportspeople from Upper Bavaria
German military personnel killed in World War II
People from the Kingdom of Bavaria